Wang Shizhen is the name of:

Wang Shizhen (Tang dynasty) (759–809), Tang dynasty warlord, de facto ruler of Chengde
Wang Shizhen (Ming dynasty) (1526–1590), Ming dynasty poet, writer, artist and litterateur.
Wang Shizhen (Beiyang government) (1861–1930), general and minister of the Beiyang government of Republic of China
Wang Shizhen (physician) (1916–2016), founder of Chinese nuclear medicine

See also
Wang Zhizhen